The 1990 Cincinnati Bearcats football team represented the University of Cincinnati during the 1990 NCAA Division I-A football season. The Bearcats, led by head coach Tim Murphy, participated as independent and played their home games at Riverfront Stadium, as Nippert Stadium was undergoing renovations.

Schedule

References

Cincinnati
Cincinnati Bearcats football seasons
Cincinnati Bearcats football